Henry Hussey, 2nd Baron Hussey (1302 – 21 July 1349) was an English nobleman. He was the son of the 1st Baron Hussey and Isabel Hussey. "Sir Henry Huse, knight", was returned as Knight of the Shire for Dorset at the age of 30 in 1331/2. He was married circa 1314 to Maud. On their wedding day his father gave the bride and groom an estate in Kent. A son, named Mark Hussey, was born to Henry Hussey by Maud in about 1316.

He was later remarried to Katherine FitzAlan, daughter of Edmund FitzAlan, Earl of Arundel. Katherine was sister to Richard FitzAlan, later Earl of Arundel.

The children born to Henry Hussey by Katherine FitzAlan-Hussey were Elizabeth Hussey (circa 1318), Henry Hussey (circa 1320), and Richard Hussey (circa 1323). Katherine died in 1375, according to History of Gloucestershire. Her will was proved in 1376.

In "Easter week, 1345" in Risley, Gloucestershire an inquisition determined that Henry Hussey held a moiety of Saperton manor and a moiety of Rusyndene manor in Gloucestershire, from the king by a knight's service. According to the Patent Records in 1348 Henry Hussey (with others) was commissioned "to determine whether a wall on a river flowing near the border of Kent and Sussex, near Knellesflote, should be dismantled."

Henry Hussey died on 21 July 1349 according to Complete Peerage. He left property in Gloucestershire, Sussex, Southampton, Surrey, Kent, and Wiltshire.

Henry Hussey, his grandson and son of Mark Hussey, was named as his next heir and stated to be aged six. His widow Katherine FitzAlan-Hussey later married Sir Andrew Peverell.

References

1292 births
1349 deaths
Barons in the Peerage of England
14th-century English people